The Calgary Roughnecks are a lacrosse team based in Calgary, Alberta. The team plays in the National Lacrosse League (NLL). The 2022 season is the 20th in franchise history.

Final standings

Regular season

Playoffs

Roster

Entry Draft
The 2021 NLL Entry Draft took place on August 28, 2021. The Roughnecks made the following selections:

See also
2022 NLL season

References

Calgary
Calgary Roughnecks seasons
Calgary Roughnecks